Demos Medical Publishing, now an imprint of Springer Publishing Company, publishes books on neurology, oncology, pathology, and other medical subjects. It targets physicians, families, and individuals with disabilities. The company was founded in 1986 by Dr. Diana M. Schneider. A majority interest in the company was purchased by the Mannheim Trust in 2004. Demos merged with Springer Publishing in 2015.

References 

Publishing companies of the United States
American companies established in 1986
Publishing companies established in 1986 
1996 establishments in New York (state)